Alan Godfrey is a retired police constable of the West Yorkshire Police who claims to have seen an unidentified flying object and been the victim of an alien abduction.

UFO encounter 
While checking reports of cattle wandering around a local council estate in Todmorden, West Yorkshire, on 28 November 1980, Godfrey claims he saw a bright light hovering above the road ahead that he described as a rotating "diamond shaped" object, about 20ft high and 14ft wide. Godfrey states that he tried to radio for help but that the equipment would not work, when the object suddenly vanished and he found himself 30 yards away further down the road. According to Godfrey, he experienced missing time of approximately twenty-five minutes, a split boot, and an itchy, red mark on his foot. Godfrey says that via hypnotic regression arranged by solicitor Harry Harris, he recalled how a beam of light blinded him and made him pass out, before waking up inside a room being medically examined by small beings and a tall man with a beard. At the age of 70, however, Godfrey told the Huddersfield Daily Examiner that the abduction part he told under hypnosis was probably a dream, adding, “I never said I was abducted by aliens".

Connection to Adamski case 
Six months earlier, on 9 June 1980, Godfrey investigated the death of 56-year-old Zigmund Adamski, who had been missing since 6 June when he set off to buy groceries and did not return. Adamski's body was found on 9 June, twenty miles away from his home at a coal yard in Todmorden on top of a 10ft high coal pile by coal yard worker Trevor Parker. Adamski was wearing a suit but his shirt was missing as were his watch and wallet. His clothes were "improperly" fastened and his hair had also been cropped short in a "roughly cut" manner. Godfrey told reporters that he believed it possible that Adamski may have been abducted by aliens and placed on the coal pile "by someone or something", saying "I am open minded. I can't rule it out." Other theories put forward have suggested that Adamski was killed by KGB agents, or that he had been struck by ball lightning, become dazed and confused and wandered off to the coal pile and died. Adamski's wife, Lottie, initially suspected that her husband had been kidnapped. According to sceptics, "this case is just another example of a story that sounds good at first, but that dissolves under direct scrutiny. As are so many stories of space alien abduction." Godfrey has self-published Who or What Were They?, a book that includes his speculations regarding the Adamski case, abduction claims by Travis Walton, and his own UFO sighting.

References

External links
 

Living people
Alien abduction reports
West Yorkshire Police officers
People from Todmorden
UFO sightings in England
Ufologists
Year of birth missing (living people)